The National Languages Committee was established in 1928 by the Ministry of Education of the Republic of China with the purpose of standardizing and popularizing the usage of Standard Chinese (also called Mandarin) in the Republic of China. The committee was known in English as the Mandarin Promotion Council or the National Languages Promotion Committee until 2003, but the Chinese name has not changed. The phrase Guoyu (國語 "National language") typically refers to Standard Chinese, but could also be interpreted as referring to "national languages". The reorganization of the Executive Yuan  made the duties of the National Languages Committee be transferred to the Department of Lifelong Education's fourth sector (Reading and Language Education) from 2013.

It was created as the Preparatory Commission for the Unification of the National Language by the Republic (then still based in Nanjing) on 21 April 1919. On 12 December 1928, the commission was renamed to the Preparatory Committee for the Unification of the National Language, headed by Woo Tsin-hang and had 31 members. The committee was revived in 1983 as the Mandarin Promotion Council based on Taiwan.

The decisions reached by the Council include:
 Changing the first- and second-grade textbook titles from Guowen (國文 "National Script") to Guoyu (國語 "National language"), on 24 January 1920
 Publishing the Guoyin Zidian (國音字典 "National Pronunciation Dictionary") edited by Woo Tsin-hang, on 24 December 1920. The Guoyin Zidian later became the Mandarin Chinese Dictionary, a comprehensive online and CD-ROM Traditional Chinese Mandarin dictionary.

The Committee for National Language Romanization (羅馬字母拼音研究委員會) under the Council selects and modifies Romanization Systems. The official Mandarin romanization systems in the Republic of China have been:
 Gwoyeu Romatzyh (1928–1984)
 Mandarin Phonetic Symbols II (1984–2002)
 Tongyong Pinyin (2002–2008)
 Hanyu Pinyin (starting on 1 January 2009)

Since the Taiwanization movement took hold in government, the committee also handles:
 Researching mainland China Mandarin
 Researching the Formosan languages
 Researching other varieties of Chinese or languages like Hakka and Taiwanese Hokkien

See also
 List of language regulators
 Speak Mandarin Campaign (Singapore)

References

External links
 National Languages Committee official website
 National Languages Committee: mandate (in the English-language section of the Ministry of Education website)

Standard Chinese
Executive Yuan
Education in Taiwan
Language regulators
1928 establishments in China
Language policy in Taiwan